Civic Democratic Union may refer to:
 Civic Democratic Union (Slovakia) (Občianska demokratická únia), former political party in Slovakia
 Unión Cívica Democrática, a political movement in Honduras